ʿUthmān ibn Maẓʿūn was one of the Companions of the Islamic prophet Muhammad.

Biography
He was married to Khawla bint Hakim, who like himself was one of the earliest converts to Islam. According to Ibn Ishaq, he led a group of Muslims to Abyssinia in the first migration which some of the early Muslims undertook to escape persecution in Mecca. He was also a cousin of Umayya ibn Khalaf.

There is a narration that, out of religious devotion, Uthman ibn Maz'un decided to dedicate himself to prayer and take a vow of chastity from his wife. His wife spoke to the prophet Muhammad about this, and the prophet gently reminded Uthman that he himself, as the prophet, also had a family life, and that Uthman had a responsibility to his family and should not adopt monasticism as a form of religious practice.

He died in the 3rd year after the hijra (624/625 CE) and was either the first Companion or the first Muhajir (immigrant to Medina) to be buried in the cemetery of al-Baqi' in Medina.

References

Companions of the Prophet
624 deaths
Quraysh
Burials at Jannat al-Baqī